Sausset-les-Pins or simply Sausset is a seaside commune in the Bouches-du-Rhône department in the Provence-Alpes-Côte d'Azur region in Southern France. It is located on the Côte Bleue, just west of Carry-le-Rouet. It is part of the Aix-Marseille-Provence Metropolis. In 2019, Sausset-les-Pins had a population of 7,581.

Geography
Sausset-les-Pins located 35 km (21.7 mi) west of Marseille and 42 km (26 mi) southwest of Aix-en-Provence. The commune covers an area of 12.1 km2 (4.7 sq mi).

History
In 1855 a castle was built. In 1924 the commune of Sausset-les-Pins was created from part of the commune of Carry-le-Rouet.

In 1915, the Sausset-les-Pins TER PACA railway station opened on the Miramas–L'Estaque railway.

Demographics

See also
Communes of the Bouches-du-Rhône department

References

External links
Official website

Communes of Bouches-du-Rhône
Bouches-du-Rhône communes articles needing translation from French Wikipedia